Dirk Eitzert (born 1 November 1968) is a retired German football midfielder.

References

External links
 

1968 births
Living people
German footballers
Footballers from Dortmund
Bundesliga players
2. Bundesliga players
VfL Bochum II players
VfL Bochum players
Association football midfielders